Ryan de Villiers (born 30 November 1992) is a South African actor. He is known for his role as Dylan Stassen in the film Moffie (2019). He began his career on stage, earning Naledi and Fleur du Cap Theatre Awards.

Early life
De Villiers is from East London and grew up between the Eastern Cape and KwaZulu-Natal. He is the son of conservationist Div and teacher Annette and has a sister. He attended Rivermead Preparatory School and Stirling High School. He was going to pursue Accounting and Economics, but switched to Drama with Politics and International Studies, graduating with a Bachelor of Arts with distinctions from Rhodes University in 2015. He studied abroad in the United States at Willamette University in Oregon.

Filmography

Stage

Awards and nominations

References

External links
 
 Ryan de Villiers at Artists One

Living people
1992 births
21st-century South African male actors
People from East London, Eastern Cape
Rhodes University alumni
South African male film actors
South African male musical theatre actors